Zajączkowo  is a village in the administrative district of Gmina Milejewo, within Elbląg County, Warmian-Masurian Voivodeship, in northern Poland.

Before 1772 the area was part of the Kingdom of Poland; from 1772–1945, Prussia and Germany (East Prussia).

The village has a population of 130.

References

Villages in Elbląg County